Vijay Halai (born 13 September 1992) is an Indian cricketer. He made his first-class debut for Baroda in the 2016–17 Ranji Trophy on 13 November 2016.

References

External links
 

1992 births
Living people
Indian cricketers
Baroda cricketers
People from Bhuj